Justinus van Nassau (1559–1631) was the only extramarital child of William the Silent. He was a Dutch army commander known for his role in the defeat of the Spanish Armada, his leadership of the forces in Breda during the siege of 1624, and the depiction of his surrender in the painting by Diego Velázquez, The Surrender of Breda.

His mother was Eva Elincx, William's mistress between his first and second marriages. William of Orange recognized Justinus and raised him with his other children.

Justinus studied in Leiden and became Lieutenant-Colonel on 17 May 1583. On 28 February 1585 he became lieutenant-admiral of Zeeland, and fought in 1588 against the Spanish Armada, capturing two galleons.

From 1601 until 1625 he was governor of Breda. In 1625 he had to surrender Breda to the Spanish general Ambrogio Spinola after a siege of 11 months. Justinus was allowed to leave for Leiden.

Issue

On 4 December 1597 he married Anne, Baronesse de Mérode (9 January 1567 – Leiden, 8 October 1634) and had three children.

 Willem Maurits van Nassau (June 1603 – d. 1638 in Leiden), married Maria van Aerssen van Sommelsdijk and had issue:
 Justinus, no issue.
 Justina van Nassau (March 1635 – c. 1676), married George van Cats ter Coulster (1632–1676) and had issue:
 Willem Maurits van Cats, (c. 1670 – December 1743).
 Anna van Nassau (c. 1638 – The Hague, 1721), married Willem Adriaan Count van Horn Batenburg and had issue.
 Louise Henriëtte van Nassau (1604 – between 1637 and 1645), no issue.
 Philips van Nassau (1605 – somewhere between 1672 and 1676), married and had issue.

He and his wife were buried in the Hooglandse Kerk in Leiden.

The following arms are recorded for Justinus, based on those of his father William the Silent.

Family tree

References

1559 births
1631 deaths
Justinus
Justinus
People of the Anglo-Spanish War (1625–1630)